Gastroboletus amyloideus is a species of fungus in the family Boletaceae. The species was first described scientifically in 1969 by American mycologist Harry Delbert Thiers. Characterized by its amyloid spore staining reaction, the fungus is found in California.

References

External links

Boletaceae
Fungi described in 1969
Fungi of North America